Iris sprengeri is a species in the genus Iris, it is also in the subgenus of Iris and in the Oncocyclus section. It is from the mountain slopes of Turkey. It has large flowers which are white, silver-white or cream, with purple-red or reddish-brown veining and a golden yellow beard and a dark purple or deep purple-brown signal patch.

Description
It has a slender rhizome, which have long slender stolons. The rhizome and stolons form creeping plants, that can produce plant offshoots that can be a distance away from the parent plant. This ability is not shared by other Oncocyclus species plants.

It blooms in April and May, or July. The flower can be up  in diameter.

Like other irises, it has two pairs of petals: three large sepals (outer petals), known as the 'falls', and three inner, smaller petals (or tepals), known as the 'standards'. They have a slightly folded edges. They are white or cream coloured, with yellow spots and purplish-red, reddish-brown or purplish-brown veining. They can also have bright purple-red spots and veins, instead of yellow spots. In the middle of the falls, there is a blotch or signal patch which is large, dark purple, or deep purple-brown. Also on the falls is a narrow row of hairs, called the 'beard', which is cream, yellow, or golden yellow. yellow beard
They have a white, or silvery-white ground, with purplish-brown, or purplish-red and black veining.<ref name=Rare/

After it has flowered, the plant produces an ellipsoid shaped seed capsule that is 3 cm x 1.5 cm.

Biochemistry
As most irises are diploid, having two sets of chromosomes. This can be used to identify hybrids and classification of groupings. It's chromosome count has not been published.

Taxonomy
It was originally discovered in 1903 by German engineer businessman and plant collector Walter Siehe, in Asia-Minor (on the Taurus Mountains). He then described and published the name in The Gardeners' Chronicle Series 3, Vol.36 on page 50 in 1904. Siehe also published and described Iris elizabethae in 1903, it was recorded having larger flowers, and only found on Mount Hasan (Hasan Dagi) but the plant was later declared to be a synonym of Iris sprengeri.

The Latin specific epithet sprengeri is in honour of the German Nurseryman, Carl L. Sprenger, (1846-1917) for whom Tulipa sprengeri is also named.

It has been verified as Iris sprengeri by United States Department of Agriculture and the Agricultural Research Service on 4 March 2003, and is an accepted name by the RHS. It was last listed in the RHS Plant Finder in 2017.

Distribution and habitat

It is native to temperate Asia.

Range
It is found in regions of Turkey, and in Iran.

Within Turkey it is found in Niğde and Konya provinces, and growing on Mount Hasan in Aksaray in Aksaray Province.

Habitat
It prefers to grow in the mountains, on steppes and screes, and unstable pumice slopes.
 

Cultivation
Iris sprengeri can be grown in soils that have good drainage and are highin nutients, it needs to be dry through the summer after flowering. As similar to other Oncocyclus species irises it is more intolerant of water. A sign when to stop watering is when the leaves turn yellow.

It can also be grown in a pot or container,as long it is divided or repotted when the rhizomes start touching the edges of the pot or container.

Toxicity
Like many other irises, most parts of the plant are poisonous (including the rhizome and leaves), if mistakenly ingested, it can cause stomach pains and vomiting. Also handling the plant may cause a skin irritation or an allergic reaction.

References

Other sources
 Davis, P. H., ed. 1965–1988. Flora of Turkey and the east Aegean islands.
 Mathew, B. 1981. The Iris. 59.

External links 

sprengeri
Plants described in 1904
Flora of Iran
Flora of Turkey